Och may refer to:
 Och (spirit)
 6-oxocamphor hydrolase, an enzyme
 Och, alternative spelling of Uch, a city in Bahawalpur District, Pakistan
 John R. Oishei Children's Hospital, Buffalo, New York, United States
 Outram Community Hospital, a community hospital in Singapore